Fathabad (also Romanized as Fatḩābād) is a village in Qaleh Biyaban Rural District, in the Central District of Darab County, Fars Province, Iran. At the 2006 census, its population was 1,444, in 333 families.

References 

Populated places in Darab County